Heliophanus maralal is a jumping spider species in the genus Heliophanus.  It was first described by Wanda Wesołowska in 2003 and lives in Kenya.

References

Endemic fauna of Kenya
Salticidae
Fauna of Kenya
Spiders of Africa
Spiders described in 2003
Taxa named by Wanda Wesołowska